Varhaug may refer to:

People
Pål Varhaug (born 1991), a professional racing driver in Norway

Places
Varhaug, a village in Hå municipality in Rogaland county, Norway
Varhaug (municipality), a former municipality in Rogaland county, Norway
Varhaug Church, a church in Hå municipality in Rogaland county, Norway
Varhaug Station, a railway station in Hå municipality in Rogaland county, Norway

Other
Varhaug IL, the main sports club for people living in the village of Varhaug, Norway